National Highway 40 (NH 40), a combination of previous national highways 4 and 18, is a national highway in India. It starts at National Highway 44 junction at Kurnool and passes through Kadapa and Chittoor and terminates at Ranipet in Tamil Nadu.
It is called Rayalaseema Express Highway. The highway was transformed into four lanes between Kurnool and Kadapa .

Route
It starts at Kurnool and passes through Nandyal, Allagadda, Mydukur, Kadapa, Rayachoti, Pileru, Chittoor and ends at Ranipet.

Kurnool ↔ Nandyal ↔ Allagadda ↔ Mydukur ↔ Kadapa ↔ Rayachoti ↔ Pileru ↔ Chittoor ↔ Ranipet

Junctions  

  Terminal near Kurnool.
  near Kurnool
  near Nandyal
  near Mydukur
  near Kadapa bypass
  near Rayachoti
  near Pileru
  near Puthalapattu
  near Chittoor
  Terminal near Ranipet.

See also
 List of National Highways in India (by Highway Number)
 National Highways Development Project

References

External links
 NH 40 on OpenStreetMap

National highways in India
40
40